Cotton tree may refer to:
 Cotton Tree (Sierra Leone), a kapok tree (Ceiba pentandra) that is an historic symbol of Freetown in Sierra Leone
 Bombax ceiba, a plant species commonly known as cotton tree
 Gossypium, the cotton plant, which can grow from a bush to a tree

Places
 Cotton Tree, Queensland, a neighborhood in Maroochydore, Queensland, Australia
 Cottontree, a hamlet in Lancashire, England, sometimes spelt Cotton Tree

See also
 Cottonwood (disambiguation)
 Bombax, a genus of plants often called "silk cotton tree", "red cotton tree", or "kapok tree"
 Kapok tree, several plant species
 Silk-cotton tree, several plant species
 Hibiscus tilliaceus, a flowering tree sometimes known as the cottonwood tree